The 2018–19 ABL season was the ninth season of competition of the ASEAN Basketball League. The regular season started on 16 November 2018 and ended on 28 March 2019.

Teams

All the teams in 2017–18 season returned for this season. However, the following changes happened:
 Chong Son Kung Fu relocated and rebranded to Macau Black Bears.
 Zhuhai Wolf Warriors was the 10th team in the ABL, added after Kung Fu relocated to Macau.

Venues

Personnel

Imports
The following is the list of imports, which had played for their respective teams at least once. Each team can register 3 imports. Flags indicate the citizenship/s the player holds.

Local Heritage

Regular season
Each team will play 26 games throughout the season, 13 at home and 13 away. Each team will play the remaining 4 teams in their group, twice each at home and away. Each team will also play the 5 teams from the other group, once each at home and away. The groupings are as follows:
 Bears, Warriors, Eastern, Dreamers, Alab
 Knights, Slingers, Dragons, Vampire, Heat

Standings

Results

Playoffs

Bracket

Quarterfinals

The quarterfinals was a best-of-three series, with the higher seeded team hosting Game 1, and if necessary Game 3.

|}

Semifinals

The semifinals was a best-of-three series, with the higher seeded team hosting Game 1, and if necessary Game 3.

|}

Finals

The finals is a best-of-five series, with the higher seeded team hosting Game 1, 2, and 5, if necessary. 

|}

Awards

End-of-season awards 
The winners were announced before Game 2 of the 2019 ABL Finals at the OCBC Arena, Singapore.

Most Valuable Players:
Local: Bobby Ray Parks Jr. (San Miguel Alab Pilipinas)
World Import: Xavier Alexander (Singapore Slingers)
Defensive Player of the Year: John Fields (Singapore Slingers)
Coach of the Year: Dean Murray (Formosa Dreamers)

Players of the Week

References

External links
 Official website

 
2018–19 in Asian basketball leagues
2018-19
2018–19 in Chinese basketball
2018–19 in Hong Kong basketball
2018–19 in Indonesian basketball
2018–19 in Malaysian basketball
2018–19 in Philippine basketball leagues
2018–19 in Singaporean basketball
2018–19 in Taiwanese basketball
2018–19 in Thai basketball
2018–19 in Vietnamese basketball